Aleksa Terzić (born 17 August 1999) is a Serbian professional footballer, who plays as a left-back for Serie A club Fiorentina and the Serbia national team.

Club career

Red Star Belgrade
Born in Belgrade, Terzić grew up in Mladenovac, where he also started playing football in the local club. In 2010, he moved to Red Star Belgrade, and passed the whole youth categories. He signed his first, three-year professional contract in November 2016. In early 2017, he was marked as one of the top club's prospects by general director Zvezdan Terzić. He was licensed for the 2017–18 season with first squad, and played with youth team until team until the end of a calendar year respectively. In early 2018, after trained with senior squad during the winter-break, Terzić moved on loan to the Serbian League Belgrade side Grafičar Beograd for the rest of season. Following the end of the League Belgrade campaign, in which he made 10 appearances with the satellite club, Terzić returned to Red Star in June 2018. During the summer pre-season, while Milan Rodić was with national team at the 2018 FIFA World Cup, Tezić got split playing time with Stefan Hajdin as a left-back. At the beginning of the 2018–19 season, Terzić has been licensed for the 2018–19 UEFA Champions League qualifications. After he missed both of matches against Spartaks Jūrmala in the first round, Terzić played a full-time match against Dinamo Vranje on 20 July 2018, which was his Serbian SuperLiga debut. Terzić also started the 5th fixture match of the season, when he assisted to Slavoljub Srnić in 2–1 home victory over Čukarički.

Fiorentina
On 13 June 2019, Terzić joined to Italian Serie A club Fiorentina.

Loan to Empoli
On 1 September 2020, Terzić joined on loan to Empoli until 30 June 2021.

International career
Terzić made his debut for the Serbia U16 on 3 March 2015, replacing Nikola Savić in 1−1 draw to Slovenia. In October same year, Terzić also made his debut for Serbia U17 in the first round qualification match for the Under-17 UEFA Euro, against Luxembourg. Playing with the team until 2016, Terzić had been named in squad for the final competition. In September 2016, Terzić was a part of the Serbia under-19 team on the memorial tournament "Stevan Vilotić - Ćele", where he debuted in the opening match against United States. On 29 November 2016, while he played with U19 squad respectively, Terzić scored on his debut for Serbia U18 against Montenegro. In March next year, coach Milan Obradović called Terzić into the squad for elite qualification round of the 2017 UEFA European Under-19 Championship. Terzić also contributed to the team during the 2017−18 qualifications, scoring a goal in 4−1 victory over Azerbaijan on 7 October 2017. As a coach of the Serbia under-21, Goran Đorović included Terzić to the squad for competitive matches against Macedonia and Russia in September 2018.

He made his debut for Serbia senior national team on 7 June 2021 in a friendly against Jamaica.

Career statistics

Club

International

References

External links
 Profile at the ACF Fiorentina website 
 
 
 

1999 births
Living people
Serbian footballers
Footballers from Belgrade
Association football fullbacks
Serbia international footballers
Serbia youth international footballers
Serbia under-21 international footballers
Red Star Belgrade footballers
Serbian SuperLiga players
RFK Grafičar Beograd players
Serie A players
Serie B players
ACF Fiorentina players
Empoli F.C. players
Serbian expatriate footballers
Serbian expatriate sportspeople in Italy
Expatriate footballers in Italy